McLaughlin & Harvey is a building and civil engineering firm founded in 1853. It operates all over UK and Ireland from its head offices located in Mallusk, just north of Belfast.

History 
Henry McLaughlin and William Harvey first established their business as builders and contractors in Belfast in 1853. The firm bought Barr Construction in 2007.

In 2019, McLaughlin & Harvey Holdings had a turnover of £513.4 million. Its main subsidiary firms – McLaughlin & Harvey Ltd in Belfast and Trench Holdings Ltd in Scotland  - contributed £268m and £245m respectively. Turnover for the 800-strong group dropped in 2020, partly due to the impacts of the COVID-19 pandemic in the United Kingdom, to £480m, with profit of £5.9m, down a half from £11.5m in 2019. The company paid £2m in dividends in 2020 after claiming £2.2m of furlough cash from the UK Government's Coronavirus Job Retention Scheme.

Recent projects
the Stena Line Terminal in Belfast, and its equivalent at Loch Ryan in south west Scotland, completed in 2011
Critical Care Building at the Royal Victoria Hospital, Belfast, completed in 2015
Liverpool F.C.'s new £50m training facility, completed in 2020
Winter Gardens conference centre, Blackpool, completed in 2021
River Clyde dock King George V West Quay (Berth 10) in Glasgow, completed in 2021
Broughty Ferry flood protection scheme, completed in 2022
Victoria and Albert Museum facility in east London, due to be completed in 2024
£55m cruise terminal in Liverpool, due to be completed in 2024

Operations
McLaughlin & Harvey undertakes a wide range of work in the public and private sectors, including commercial, leisure and residential projects. The company's divisions include building construction, civil engineering, facilities management, frameworks, specialist joinery, and offshore. In June 2021, the company launched a new fit-out division.

References

External links 
 

Engineering companies of Northern Ireland
British companies established in 1853
Construction and civil engineering companies of the United Kingdom
1853 establishments in Ireland
Construction and civil engineering companies established in 1853